Archibald Ronald McDonald Gordon (19 March 1927 – 8 August 2015) was a British Anglican bishop. He was the Bishop of Portsmouth from 1975 to 1984. He was the Bishop at Lambeth from 1984 and, additionally, the Bishop to the Forces from 1985. He ended his career as sub-dean at Christ Church, Oxford, from 1991 to 1996.

Early years
Gordon was the son of the diplomat Sir Archibald Gordon CMG and his wife Dorothy, the daughter of Charles Silvester Horne, MP: his great-grandfather, Herbert Cozens-Hardy, 1st Baron Cozens-Hardy, was Master of the Rolls from 1907 until 1918. He was educated at Rugby School and Balliol College, Oxford (organ scholar) BA 1950, MA 1952 before studying for ordination at Cuddesdon College.

Ordained ministry
After a curacy in the East End of London, Gordon returned to Ripon College Cuddesdon as chaplain in 1955. After four years he moved to Birmingham, firstly as a parish priest and then as a canon residentiary at the cathedral. After 12 years in Birmingham he returned to Oxford as vicar of the University Church of St Mary the Virgin.

Gordon was consecrated as a bishop on 23 September 1975 by Donald Coggan, Archbishop of Canterbury, at Westminster Abbey. In 1975 he was appointed to be Bishop of Portsmouth, a role he was to hold for nine years with appointment to the House of Lords coming in 1981; he resigned on 31 May 1984. He was head of the Archbishop of Canterbury’s staff as Bishop at Lambeth from 1984 until 1991 and additionally, Bishop to the Forces from 1985 to 1990. From 1991 until 1996 he was Sub-Dean of Christ Church, Oxford.

Later life
After retiring in 1991 he returned to Oxford where he continued to minister and served on a variety of Church of England committees: namely the Advisory Board for Redundant Churches and the Oxford Mission. He was also formerly a member of the Court of Ecclesiastical Causes Reserved.

Gordon died on 8 August 2015.

References

1927 births
2015 deaths
People educated at Rugby School
Alumni of Balliol College, Oxford
Bishops of Portsmouth (Anglican)
Bishops at Lambeth
Bishops to the Forces
Fellows of Christ Church, Oxford
20th-century Church of England bishops